Jerome Township may refer to the following places in the United States:

 Jerome Township, Gove County, Kansas
 Jerome Township, Michigan
 Jerome Township, Union County, Ohio

Township name disambiguation pages